A. Natarajan was an Indian politician and Member of the Legislative Assembly of Tamil Nadu. He was elected to the Tamil Nadu legislative assembly as a Dravida Munnetra Kazhagam candidate from Perur constituency in the 1977, 1984, 1989 and 1996 elections.

Natarajan, who was also a trade union leader, was not nominated by the DMK to contest the 2001 elections. This decision caused some resentment among party members.

He died on 13 June 2017.

References 

Year of birth missing
2017 deaths
Dravida Munnetra Kazhagam politicians
Tamil Nadu MLAs 1996–2001

Tamil Nadu MLAs 1985–1989